Edward Jones (born 12 February 1995) is an Emirati-born British racing driver who competes part-time in the IMSA SportsCar Championship, driving the No. 20 Oreca 07 for High Class Racing, and part-time in the NASCAR Craftsman Truck Series, driving the No. 20 Chevrolet Silverado for Young's Motorsports. Primarily an open wheel racing driver, Jones previously competed in the Formula Renault Eurocup, Formula Three, Indy Lights, IndyCar Series and FIA World Endurance Championship.

Jones won the 2016 Indy Lights championship driving for Carlin Motorsport in just his second season in the series. He joined the IndyCar Series full-time in 2017 driving for Dale Coyne Racing and finished third in the 2017 Indianapolis 500. In 2018, he drove full-time for Chip Ganassi Racing and in 2019, he drove the majority of the IndyCar season in an entry fielded by Ed Carpenter Racing in a collaboration with sports car racing team Scuderia Corsa. In 2020, Jones was scheduled to leave IndyCar and compete in the Deutsche Tourenwagen Masters but did not end up running any races due to COVID-19 pandemic travel restrictions. In 2021, he returned to IndyCar and DCR, driving the team's joint entry with Vasser-Sullivan Racing. In 2022, he competed full-time in the FIA World Endurance Championship for Jota Sport.

At different points in his career, Jones has competed under both British and Emirati licences.

Racing career

Karting
Born in Dubai, Jones began his racing career in karting in local championships at the age of nine. In 2005 he clinched the United Arab Emirates karting championship title. He collected six titles in various classes before he started a karting campaign in Europe in 2008. He raced in the Rotax Max and KF3 categories until 2010.

InterSteps and Formula Renault
In 2011 Jones made his debut in single-seaters taking part in the new-for-2011 InterSteps championship for Fortec Motorsport, finishing the championship in fourth place with one win. As well as this, Jones raced for Fortec in the Eurocup Formula Renault 2.0 and the British Formula Renault Championship, as well as the off-season Formula Renault UK Finals Series, finishing 15th in the standings with four-point-scoring finishes.

Jones continued his collaboration with Fortec into 2012, competing in Formula Renault 2.0 NEC and the Eurocup Formula Renault 2.0. His only points finish in the Eurocup was a ninth place at Le Castellet, that brought him 27th place in the series standings.

Jones remained at Fortec in 2013, competing again in some of the Formula Renault Eurocup rounds taking two podium positions at the Red Bull Ring in Spielburg, Austria. He finished 11th in the championship with 45 points.

Formula Three

After contesting the final round of the 2012 European F3 Open Championship for Team West-Tec, Jones moved into the series full-time the following year, competing for the same team. Despite missing the opening round, he exceeded Sandy Stuvik in the championship battle with six wins and another four podiums.

Jones, who already competed for Fortec in the Hockenheimring round of the FIA European Formula Three Championship in 2013, raced for Carlin Motorsport in 2014.

Indy Lights
In 2015, Jones moved to the Indy Lights series, the recognised feeder championship for the IndyCar Series. He was signed to drive for Carlin, as he did in Formula 3, and took pole position and the race victory in both his and Carlin's first event in the series in St. Petersburg, Florida. He also won the second and third races of the season, and finished third in the championship standings.

In October 2015, it was announced that Jones would return with Carlin to the Indy Lights series for 2016. With two wins at Barber and Indianapolis, Jones would claim the Lights championship over Santiago Urrutia in a controversial ending. During the last lap of the last race of the 2016 series in Laguna Seca, Jones was holding the fifth position but was helped by his teammate Félix Serrallés who was holding fourth position in the race. Serralles moved aside and gave his position to Jones, making him the champion by a slim points difference. Consequently he won the Earl Howe trophy for the best performance by a British driver in North America in 2016.

IndyCar

Dale Coyne Racing (2017)
Having won the 2016 Indy Lights title, Jones stepped up to IndyCar for 2017. On 14 November 2016 he was announced as the driver of the No. 19 for Dale Coyne Racing alongside Sébastien Bourdais. He achieved his first podium finish in the series at the 2017 Indy 500. Jones was the 2017 Rookie of the Year.

Chip Ganassi Racing (2018)
On 25 October 2017, he was announced as the driver of the No. 10 for Chip Ganassi Racing alongside Scott Dixon for 2018. In September 2018 it was announced that he would be replaced for 2019 by Felix Rosenqvist.

Ed Carpenter Racing Scuderia Corsa (2019)
On 17 October 2018, it was confirmed that Jones would run all non-oval events as well as the 2019 Indianapolis 500 for a joint venture between Ed Carpenter Racing and Scuderia Corsa, driving the No. 20 in the road/street events and the No. 63 in the Indy 500. In his first race with the team, Jones broke a bone in his hand after a shunt that knocked him out of the race. 

Jones with Scuderia Corsa placed in the Fast 9 in Indianapolis 500 qualifying and eventually placed fifth overall in the field. He also topped a practice session.

DTM
In December 2019, it was announced that Jones would be driving for Audi in the 2020 DTM series.

However, he was replaced by Harrison Newey in the beginning of the season as he was stuck in Dubai due to travel restrictions because of COVID-19.

Return to IndyCar

Dale Coyne Racing (2021)
In January 2021, Dale Coyne Racing announced they have re-signed Ed Jones to compete in the 2021 IndyCar season.

NASCAR
On March 11, 2023, it was announced that Jones would make his debut in NASCAR, driving in the Truck Series race at Circuit of the Americas in the No. 20 truck for Young's Motorsports.

Racing record

Career summary

 As Jones was a guest driver, he was ineligible for points.
* Season still in progress.

Complete Eurocup Formula Renault 2.0 results
(key) (Races in bold indicate pole position) (Races in italics indicate fastest lap)

† As Jones was a guest driver, he was ineligible for points.

Complete FIA Formula 3 European Championship results
(key)

† As Jones was a guest driver, he was ineligible for points.

American open-wheel racing results

Indy Lights

IndyCar Series
(key)

* Season still in progress.

Indianapolis 500

Complete IMSA SportsCar Championship results
(key) (Races in bold indicate pole position; races in italics indicate fastest lap)

† Points only counted towards the Michelin Endurance Cup, and not the overall LMP2 Championship.
* Season still in progress.

Complete FIA World Endurance Championship results
(key) (Races in bold indicate pole position; races in italics indicate fastest lap)

* Season still in progress.

Complete 24 Hours of Le Mans results

NASCAR
(key) (Bold – Pole position awarded by qualifying time. Italics – Pole position earned by points standings or practice time. * – Most laps led.)

Craftsman Truck Series

 Season still in progress

References

External links

 
 

1995 births
Living people
British racing drivers
British Formula Renault 2.0 drivers
British Formula Three Championship drivers
Formula Renault Eurocup drivers
Euroformula Open Championship drivers
FIA Formula 3 European Championship drivers
Formula Renault 2.0 NEC drivers
Indy Lights champions
IndyCar Series drivers
Indianapolis 500 drivers
24 Hours of Daytona drivers
24 Hours of Le Mans drivers
Sportspeople from Dubai
Team West-Tec drivers
Carlin racing drivers
Dale Coyne Racing drivers
Chip Ganassi Racing drivers
Ed Carpenter Racing drivers
G-Drive Racing drivers
Jota Sport drivers
FIA World Endurance Championship drivers
WeatherTech SportsCar Championship drivers
Karting World Championship drivers
Fortec Motorsport drivers
24H Series drivers
NASCAR drivers